Johann Adam Reincken (also Jan Adams, Jean Adam, Reinken, Reinkinck, Reincke, Reinicke, Reinike; baptized 10 December 1643 – 24 November 1722) was a Dutch/German organist and composer. He was one of the most important composers of the 17th century, a friend of Dieterich Buxtehude and a major influence on Johann Sebastian Bach; however, very few of his works survive to this day.

Life

The widespread claims about Reincken's exceptional longevity stem from Johann Mattheson, who, writing in 1722, gave his date of birth as 27 April 1623. However, Reincken himself stated (on the title page of Hortus musicus) that his birthplace was Deventer, and no records were found there to support Mattheson's claim. A "Jan Reinse" was baptized in Deventer on 10 December 1643; this is the date currently accepted by most scholars, although it is in many ways as problematic as that given by Mattheson.

Reincken received primary music education in Deventer in 1650–1654, from Lucas van Lennick, organist of the Grote kerk (Lebuinuskerk). In 1654 he departed for Hamburg to study under Heinrich Scheidemann, a pupil of Jan Pieterszoon Sweelinck, organist of St. Katharine's Church (Katharinenkirche). In 1657 he returned to Deventer and became organist of the Bergkerk on 11 March; however, after only a year he left for Hamburg again, this time to become Scheidemann's assistant. When the older composer died in 1663, Reincken succeeded him at St. Katharine's. In 1665 he married one of Scheidemann's daughters, and their only child Margaretha-Maria was born three years later.

The composer kept his position at St. Katharine's until his death in 1722, although in 1705 some of the church elders attempted to appoint Johann Mattheson as Reincken's successor. Unlike many other contemporary organists, Reincken died wealthy. In his lifetime he was heralded as one of the best organists in Germany; he knew Dieterich Buxtehude closely and influenced Vincent Lübeck and Johann Sebastian Bach. A well-known anecdote tells of Bach's visit to Hamburg in 1720, and how Reincken  after hearing Bach improvise a lengthy fantasia on the Lutheran chorale "An Wasserflüssen Babylon" (paying homage to Reincken's massive fantasia on the same chorale), remarked,"I thought that this art was dead, but I see that it lives in you." Christoph Wolff adds a further detail, that on the same occasion Bach performed his organ fugue BWV 542, the theme of which is based on a Dutch popular tune (called 'Ik ben gegroet van...'), presumably as an homage to Reincken's Dutch origin. Evidently the young Sebastian Bach had been deeply impressed by Reincken's music, for he arranged several of the works from Reincken's Hortus musicus (as BWV 954, 965 and 966). In 2006, the earliest known Bach autograph was discovered in Weimar. It proved to be a copy of Reincken's An Wasserflüssen Babylon, which Bach made for his then teacher Georg Böhm in Lüneburg in 1700.

List of works

Keyboard
 Chorale fantasia An Wasserflüssen Babylon
 Chorale fantasia Was kann uns kommen an für Not
 Variations on Schweiget mir von Weibernehmen (la Meyerin) (Amsterdam, c. 1710)
 Variations on Holländische Nachtigahl (Amsterdam, c. 1710)
 Ballett with Variations (Amsterdam, c. 1710)
 Toccata in G major
 Toccata in G minor (doubtful)
 Toccata quasi Fantasia con Fuge in A major,  (doubtful)
 Fugue in G minor (spurious)
 8 harpsichord suites
 Musicalischer Clavierschatz del J.A. Reincken (1702, lost)

Other instrumental
 Hortus Musicus (1688), 6 sonatas and suites for 2 violins, viola da gamba and basso continuo
 Sonaten, Concertaten, Allemanden, Correnten, Sarabanden und Chiguen (1704), for 2 violins and harpsichord (lost)

Canons
 Was Gott thut, das ist wohl getan
 Canon a 3 voci in Hypodiapason per Augmentationem

Notes

References
 
 
 Wolff, Christoph, "Johan Sebastian Bach; The Learned Musician"  (W.W. Norton & Co, New York, 2000)

External links

1643 births
1722 deaths
18th-century German composers
18th-century classical composers
18th-century keyboardists
18th-century German male musicians
German Baroque composers
German male classical composers
German classical organists
German male organists
Composers for pipe organ
Organists and composers in the North German tradition
Male classical organists